Edwin Sutherland  is a Barbadian male track cyclist, representing Barbados at international competitions. He won the bronze medal at the 2016 Pan American Track Cycling Championships in the scratch.

References

External links

Year of birth missing (living people)
Living people
Barbadian male cyclists
Barbadian track cyclists
Place of birth missing (living people)